Amor Fati is a South Korean television romantic drama series directed by Bae Tae-seop for SBS. The series, starring Choi Jung-yoon, Ahn Jae-mo and Bae Seul-ki, is a healing drama about two women. For one, 'family' is everything, and for the other 'success' is all. It was premiered on SBS TV on April 12, 2021, and aired on weekdays at 08:35 (KST) for 120 episodes.

Incidentally Amor Fati was the last morning soap opera aired on South Korean television. As after three years of being unable to rate above 10%, SBS announced on September 14, 2021 that it would abolish the 30-year old time slot and expand its daytime news and lifestyle programming in its place. KBS1, TVN, KBS2 and MBC had abolished the daytime drama time slot in 2009, 2015, 2019, and 2020, respectively.

Synopsis
Amor fati is a Latin phrase meaning 'love of fate' or 'love of destiny'. German philosopher Friedrich Nietzsche quoted it as his formula for human greatness.

Amor Fati is a healing drama, which depicts the resetting of lives of its characters who rise up from despair. A woman to whom her family is everything, gets a shock of life when she learns about affair of her husband to a woman to whom success is everything. The story of the series tells their battle and how her spirits rise from despair with the help of another man going through similar situation.

Cast

Main
 Choi Jung-yoon as Do Yeon-hee
45 years old, housewife, Junho's wife, Seowoo's mother, Lara Group's only daughter-in-law
 Ahn Jae-mo as Han Jae-kyung
40 years old, a former pro-golfer, now golf teaching pro, Yoo-na's husband
 Bae Seul-ki as Kang Yoo-na 
35 years old, stylist assistant-director of Lara Fashion, Jae-kyung's wife, Ha-neul's mother, Joon-ho's lover
 Park Hyung-joon as Jang Joon-ho 
48 years old, CEO of Lara Fashion, Do Yeon-hee's husband, Lara Group's only son

Supporting
Lara group
 Kim Jong-goo as Jang Cheol-yong  
70 years old, chairman of Lara Group, Joon-ho and Joon-hee's father
 Yoon Mi-ra as Go Sang-hye  
68 years old, Yeon-hee's mother-in-law
 Kim Yeo-jin as Jang Joon-hee
35 years old, manager of Lara Fashion Planning Team
 Park Sun-Jun as Hwang Cheol-Oh 
In late 30s chairman Jang's driver
Shopping mall
 Jung Ae-yun as Jo Min-jeong 
45 years old, Yeon-hee's best friend from high school, owner of a building, president of a chicken house
 Kim Hong-pyo as Park Yoon-cheol
45 years old, Jae-kyung's senior, runs a medical store in Min-jeong's building
 Jung Ji-hoon as Han Ha-neul 
10 years old, Jae-kyung and Yoo-na's son
 Koo Bon-jun as Hwang Woo-joo  
10 years old, Min-jeong's second husband's extra-marital son
Do Yeon-hee's family
 Lee Kyung-jin as Seo Soon-boon  
63 years old, Yeon-hee's mother, president of Korean restaurant
 Jang Yoo-bin as Jang Seo-woo   
25 years old, YouTuber, Yeon-hee and Joon-ho's daughter
Others
 Kwon Jae-hwan as Seo Min-gu
52 years old, Lara Fashion CEO
 Eun Hee-soo as Jin Hye-jin
49 years old, Belle president
 Hong Jun-ki as Seo Hyeong-jin   
28 years old, resident 2nd year, major Internal Medicine 
 Lee Hwa-young as Sin Hyeong-ja 
60 years old, Yoo-na's mother, chairman's house assistant

Production

Park Hyung-joon is appearing in the SBS morning drama after 7 years. He last appeared in 2014 morning drama You're Only Mine. Bae Seul-ki last appeared in a daily drama four years back in Still Loving You (2016) on KBS1. Yoon Mi-ra made an appearance in the SBS 2018 morning drama I Am the Mother Too. Choi Jung-yoon is coming back to television drama after six years. She last appeared in 2014-2015 drama Cheongdam-dong Scandal. On 26 March, stills from script reading site were released by the production crew.

Original soundtrack

Part 1

Part 2

Part 3

Part 4

Part 5

Part 6

Viewership

References

External links
  
 Amor Fati at Daum 
 Amor Fati on Naver 
 

Seoul Broadcasting System television dramas
2021 South Korean television series debuts
2021 South Korean television series endings
Korean-language television shows
South Korean romance television series